Priscus Fogagnolo (born 17 April 1983) is an Australian mixed martial artist, multiple time National Judo Champion, multiple time Pan Pacific Brazilian Jiu Jitsu Champion and two time National Greco Roman Wrestling Champion. Priscus Fogagnolo represented Australia for Judo at the 2010 Judo World Championships

Mixed martial arts career
Priscus Fogagnolo started his mixed martial artist career with Cage Fighting Championships in Australia in 2008 up until an injury in 2012 forced him out of the sport. His only loss during that time was to James Te Huna.

Fogagnolo returned to MMA in February 2016 where he was due to fight Jesse Taylor for Hex Fight Series in Melbourne, Australia, but the fight was cancelled due to Jesse having visa problems. Fogagnolo fought Daniel Way instead and was victorious by submission in round one.

In May 2016, Fogagnolo won the Valor Fight Middleweight Championship in Hobart, Tasmania.

References

External links
 

1983 births
Living people
Australian male mixed martial artists
Light heavyweight mixed martial artists
Middleweight mixed martial artists
Mixed martial artists utilizing Greco-Roman wrestling
Mixed martial artists utilizing judo
Mixed martial artists utilizing Brazilian jiu-jitsu
Australian practitioners of Brazilian jiu-jitsu
Australian male sport wrestlers
Australian male judoka
Sportspeople from Hobart